Mexico and the United States have a complex history, with war in the 1840s and the subsequent American acquisition of more than 50% of former Mexican territory, including Texas, California, and New Mexico. Pressure from Washington forced the French invaders out in the 1860s. The Mexican Revolution of the 1910s saw many refugees flee North, and limited American invasions. Other tensions resulted from seizure of American mining and oil interests.   The two nations share a maritime and land border. Several treaties have been concluded between the two nations bilaterally, such as the Gadsden Purchase, and multilaterally, such as the 2019 United States–Mexico–Canada Agreement, replacing the 1994 NAFTA. Both are members of various international organizations, including the Organization of American States and the United Nations.

Since the late nineteenth century during the regime of President Porfirio Díaz (1876–1911), the two countries have had close diplomatic and economic ties. During Díaz's long presidency, U.S. businessmen acquired agricultural and mining interests in the country. The U.S. played an important role in the course of the Mexican Revolution (1910–20) with direct actions of the U.S. influencing the outcome.

The long border between the two countries means that peace and security in that region are important to the U.S.'s national security and international trade. The U.S. is Mexico's biggest trading partner and Mexico is the U.S.'s third-largest trading partner. In 2010, Mexico's exports totaled US$309.6 billion, and almost three quarters of those purchases were made by the United States. They are also closely connected demographically, with over one million U.S. citizens living in Mexico and Mexico being the largest source of immigrants to the United States, with about 8-10 million Mexican immigrants in the US.

While condemning the terrorist attacks of 9/11 and providing considerable relief aid to the U.S. after Hurricane Katrina, the Mexican government, pursuing neutrality in international affairs, opted not to actively join the War on Terror and the Iraq War, instead being the first nation in history to formally and voluntarily leave the Inter-American Treaty of Reciprocal Assistance in 2002, though Mexico later joined the U.S. in supporting military intervention in the Libyan Civil War.

History
The United States of America shares a unique and often complex relationship with the United Mexican States. With shared history stemming back to the Texas Revolution (1835–1836) and the Mexican–American War (1846–1848), several treaties have been concluded between the two nations, most notably the Gadsden Purchase, and multilaterally with Canada, the North American Free Trade Agreement (NAFTA). Mexico and the United States are members of various international organizations, such as the Organization of American States and the United Nations. Boundary disputes and allocation of boundary waters have been administered since 1889 by the International Boundary and Water Commission, which also maintains international dams and wastewater sanitation facilities. Once viewed as a model of international cooperation, in recent decades the IBWC has been heavily criticized as an institutional anachronism, by-passed by modern social, environmental and political issues. Illegal immigration, arms sales, and drug smuggling continue to be contending issues in 21st-century U.S.-Mexico relations.

Early history
U.S.–Mexico relations grew out of the earlier relations between the fledgling nation of the United States and the Spanish Empire and its viceroyalty of New Spain. Modern Mexico formed the core area of the Viceroyalty of New Spain at the time the United States gained its independence in the American Revolutionary War (1775–1783). Spain had served as an ally to the American colonists in that war.

The aspect of Spanish-American relations that would bear most prominently on later relations between the U.S. and Mexico was the ownership of Texas. In the early 19th century the United States claimed that Texas was part of the territory of Louisiana, and therefore had been rightfully acquired by the United States as part of the Louisiana Purchase from France in 1803. The Spanish, however, claimed it was not, as the western boundaries of Louisiana were not clearly defined. In 1819 the dispute was resolved with the signing of the Adams–Onís Treaty, in which the United States relinquished its claims to Texas and instead purchased Spanish Florida.

In 1821 New Spain gained its independence from Spain and established the First Mexican Empire under the rule of Agustín de Iturbide, who had initially fought in the royal army against the insurgents in the independence from Spain. Independent Mexico was soon recognized by the United States. The two countries quickly established diplomatic relations, with Joel Poinsett as the first envoy. In 1828 Mexico and the United States confirmed the boundaries established by the Adams–Onís Treaty by concluding the Treaty of Limits, but certain elements in the United States were greatly displeased with the treaty, as it relinquished rights to Texas. Poinsett, a supporter of the Monroe Doctrine, was convinced that republicanism was the only acceptable form of government for all countries in the Americas, and tried to influence the government of Agustín de Iturbide, which was beginning to show signs of weakness and divisiveness. Poinsett was initially sent to negotiate the acquisition of new territories for the United States, including Texas, New Mexico, and Upper California, as well as parts of Lower California, Sonora, Coahuila, and Nuevo León; but Poinsett's offer to purchase these areas was rejected by the Mexican Ministry of Foreign Affairs headed by Juan Francisco de Azcárate. He became embroiled in the country's political turmoil until his recall in 1830, but he did try to further U.S. interests in Mexico by seeking preferential treatment of U.S. goods over those of Britain, attempting to shift the U.S.–Mexico boundary, and urging the adoption of a constitution patterned on that of the U.S. Poinsett often interfered in the Affairs of the newly born Republic, and provoked disagreements with British charge d'affaires Henry George Ward. Texas remained a focal point of U.S-Mexico relations for decades. The relationship was further affected by internal struggles within the two countries: in Mexico these included concerns over the establishment of a centralized government, while in the United States it centered around the debate over the expansion of slavery, which was expanded to the Mexican territory of Texas. Some Mexican intellectuals, including José Vasconcelos would later assign the term Poinsettismo, in reference to Joel Roberts Poinsett, to designate any act of political or cultural meddling or interference by the United States in Mexican and Latin American affairs.

Beginning in the 1820s, Americans led by Stephan F. Austin and other non-Mexicans began to settle in eastern Texas in large numbers. These Anglo-American settlers, known as Texians, were frequently at odds with the Mexican government, since they sought autonomy from the central Mexican government and the expansion of black slavery into Mexico, which had abolished the institution in 1829 under Mexican president Vicente Guerrero. Their disagreements led to the Texas Revolution, one of a series of independence movements that came to the fore following the 1835 amendments to the Constitution of Mexico, which substantially altered the governance of the country. Prior to the Texas Revolution the general public of the United States was indifferent to Texas, but afterward, public opinion was increasingly sympathetic to the Texans. Following the war a Republic of Texas was declared, though independence was not recognized by Mexico, and the boundaries between the two were never agreed upon. In 1845 the United States annexed Texas, leading to a major border dispute and eventually to the Mexican–American War.

Mexican–American War (1846–1848)

The Mexican–American War was fought from 1846 to 1848. Mexico refused to acknowledge that its runaway state of Texas had achieved independence and warned that annexation to the United States would mean war. The United States annexed Texas in late 1845, and the war began the next spring. U.S. President James K. Polk encouraged Congress to declare war following a number of skirmishes on the Mexican–American border. The war proved disastrous for Mexico; the Americans seized New Mexico and California and invaded Mexico's northern provinces. In September 1847, U.S. troops under General Winfield Scott captured Mexico City. The war ended in a decisive U.S. victory; the Treaty of Guadalupe Hidalgo ended the conflict. As a result, Mexico was forced to sell all of its northernmost territory, including California and New Mexico, to the United States in the Mexican Cession. Additionally, Mexico relinquished its claims to Texas, and the United States forgave Mexico's debts to U.S. citizens. Mexicans in the annexed areas became full U.S. citizens.

There had been much talk early in the war about annexing all of Mexico, primarily to enlarge the areas open to slavery. However, many Southern political leaders were in the invasion armies and they recommended against total annexation because of the differences in political culture between the United States and Mexico.

In 1854 the United States purchased an additional  of desert land from Mexico in the Gadsden Purchase; the price was $10 million. The goal was to build a rail line through southern Arizona to California.

1850s 

Mexican President Antonio López de Santa Anna sold Mexican territory to the United States in which is known as the Gadsden Purchase, allowing the U.S. to build a railway line more easily through that region. That purchase played a significant role in the ouster of Santa Anna by Mexican liberals, in what is known as the Revolution of Ayutla, since it was widely viewed as selling Mexico's patrimony.\

As the liberals made significant political changes in Mexico and a civil reform war broke out between conservative opponents to the liberal reform, the liberal government of Benito Juárez negotiated with the U.S. to enable the building of an interoceanic route in southern Mexico. A treaty was concluded in 1859 between Melchor Ocampo and the U.S. representative Robert Milligan McLane, giving their names to the McLane-Ocampo Treaty. The U.S. Senate failed to ratify the treaty. Had it passed, Mexico would have made significant concessions to the U.S. in exchange for cash desperately needed by the liberal Mexican government.

1860s

In 1861, Mexican conservatives looked to French leader Napoleon III to abolish the Republic led by liberal President Benito Juárez. France favored the secessionist Southern states that formed the Confederate States of America in the American Civil War, but did not accord it diplomatic recognition. The French expected that a Confederate victory would facilitate French economic dominance in Mexico. Realizing the U.S. government could not intervene in Mexico, France invaded Mexico and installed an Austrian prince Maximilian I of Mexico as the puppet ruler of a Second Mexican Empire in 1864. Owing to the shared convictions of the democratically elected government of Juárez and U.S. President Lincoln, Matías Romero, Juárez's minister to Washington, mobilized support in the U.S. Congress and the U.S. protested France's violation of the Monroe Doctrine. Once the American Civil War came to a close in April 1865, the U.S. allowed supporters of Juárez to openly purchase weapons and ammunition and issued stronger warnings to Paris. Napoleon III ultimately withdrew his army in disgrace, and Emperor Maximilian, who remained in Mexico even when given the choice of exile, was executed by the Mexican government in 1867. The support that the U.S. had accorded the liberal government of Juárez, by refusing to recognize the government of Maximilian and then by supplying arms to liberal forces, helped improve the U.S.–Mexican relationship.

At war's end numerous Confederates fled to exile in Mexico. Many eventually returned to the U.S.

The Porfiriato (1876–1910)

With general Porfirio Díaz's seizure of the presidency in 1876, relations between Mexico and foreign powers, including the United States changed. It became more welcoming to foreign investment in order to reap economic gain, but it would not relinquish its political sovereignty. Díaz's regime aimed to implement "order and progress," which reassured foreign investors that their enterprises could flourish. Díaz was a nationalist and a military hero who had fought ably against the French Intervention (1862–67). The U.S. had aided the liberal government of Benito Juárez by not recognizing the French invaders and the puppet emperor that Mexican conservatives invited to rule over them, and the U.S. had also provided arms to the liberals once its own civil war was over. But Díaz was wary of the "colossus of the north" and the phrase "Poor Mexico! So far from God, so close to the United States" (Pobre México: tan lejos de Dios y tan cerca de los Estados Unidos) is attributed to him.

Díaz had ousted president Sebastián Lerdo de Tejada in the Revolution of Tuxtepec (1876). The U.S. did not recognize the Díaz government until 1878, when Rutherford B. Hayes was president. Given that France had invaded Mexico in 1862, Mexico did not initially restore diplomatic relations with it or other European powers, but did pursue a "special relationship" with the United States. One issue causing tension between Mexico and the U.S. were indigenous groups whose traditional territories straddled what was now an international boundary, most notably the Apache tribe. The Apache leader Geronimo became infamous for his raids on both sides of the border. Bandits operating in both countries also frequently crossed the border to raid Mexican and American settlements, taking advantage of mutual distrust and the differing legal codes of both nations. These threats eventually spurred increased cooperation between American and Mexican authorities, especially when concerning mounted cavalry forces. Tensions between the U.S. and Mexico remained high, but a combination of factors in the U.S. brought about recognition of the Díaz regime. These included the need to distract the U.S. electorate from the scandal of the 1876 election by focusing on the international conflict with Mexico as well as the desire of U.S. investors and their supporters in Congress to build a railway line between Mexico City and El Paso, Texas.

With the construction of the railway line linking Mexico and the United States, the border region developed from a sparsely populated frontier region into a vibrant economic zone. The construction of the railway and collaboration of the United States and Mexican armies effectively ended the Apache Wars in the late 1880s. The line between Mexico City and El Paso, Texas was inaugurated in 1884.

An ongoing issue in the border region was the exact boundary between Mexico and the U.S., particularly because the channel of the Rio Grande shifted at intervals. In 1889, the International Boundary and Water Commission was established, and still functions in the twenty-first century.

The Taft–Díaz summit

In 1909, William Howard Taft and Porfirio Díaz planned a summit in El Paso, Texas, and Ciudad Juárez, Mexico, a historic first meeting between a U.S. and a Mexican president, the first time an American president would cross the border into Mexico, and only the second international trip by a sitting president. Diaz requested the meeting to show U.S. support for his planned eighth run as president, and Taft agreed to support Diaz in order to protect the several billion dollars of American capital then invested in Mexico. Both sides agreed that the disputed Chamizal strip connecting El Paso to Ciudad Juárez would be considered neutral territory with no flags present during the summit, but the meeting focused attention on this territory and resulted in assassination threats and other serious security concerns. The Texas Rangers, 4,000 U.S. and Mexican troops, U.S. Secret Service agents, BOI agents (later FBI) and U.S. marshals were all called in to provide security. An additional 250 private security detail led by Frederick Russell Burnham, the celebrated scout, was hired by John Hays Hammond, a close friend of Taft from Yale and a former candidate for U.S. vice president in 1908 who, along with his business partner Burnham, held considerable mining interests in Mexico. On October 16, the day of the summit, Burnham and Private C.R. Moore, a Texas Ranger, discovered a man holding a concealed palm pistol standing at the El Paso Chamber of Commerce building along the procession route. Burnham and Moore captured and disarmed the assassin within only a few feet of Taft and Díaz.

The Mexican Revolution

The United States had long recognized the government of Porfirio Díaz, once the U.S. recognized his government since he had first come to power by coup.  As  Díaz approached eighty years old, he gave an interview to a journalist working for a U.S. publication, saying he was not going to run in the scheduled 1910 elections. This set off a flurry of political activity in Mexico about presidential succession.  For the U.S., it wanted the new president to continue Díaz's policies that had been favorable to U.S. business interests and produced stability domestically and internationally. Díaz reneged on his promise not to run, exiled the most viable candidate to continue his policies, General Bernardo Reyes and had the most popular opposition candidate, Francisco I. Madero jailed.  After the November elections, political unrest in Mexico became open rebellion in Morelos and in northern Mexico.  The Mexican Federal Army was unequal to the challenges of the insurgents. Díaz resigned and went into exile, an interim government was installed, and new elections were held in October 1911.  These were won by Madero. Initially, the U.S. was optimistic about Madero.  He had disbanded the rebel forces that had forced Díaz to resign; retain the Federal Army; and appeared to be open to policies favorable to the U.S., so that the  U.S. supported the transition.  The U.S. began to sour on the relationship with Madero and began actively working with opponents to the regime. Wilson, who took office shortly after Madero's assassination in 1913, rejected the legitimacy of Huerta's "government of butchers" and demanded that Mexico hold democratic elections. After U.S. navy personnel were arrested in the port of Tampico by Huerta's soldiers, the U.S. seized Veracruz, resulting in the death of 170 Mexican soldiers and an unknown number of Mexican civilians.

Wilson sent a punitive expedition led by General John J. Pershing deep into Mexico; it deprived the rebels of supplies but failed to capture Villa.

Meanwhile, Germany was trying to divert American attention from Europe by sparking a war. It sent Mexico the Zimmermann Telegram in January 1917, offering a military alliance to reclaim New Mexico, California, Nevada, Arizona and Texas, land the United States had forcibly taken via conquest in the Mexican–American War. British intelligence intercepted the message, passing it on the U.S. government. Wilson released it to the press, escalating demands for American entry into the European War. The Mexican government rejected the proposal after its military warned of massive defeat if they attempted to follow through with the plan. Mexico stayed neutral; selling large amounts of oil to Britain for her fleet.

1920–1940

Following the end of the military phase of the Mexican Revolution, there were claims by Americans and Mexicans for damage during the decade-long civil war. The American-Mexican Claims Commission was set up to resolve them during the presidency of revolutionary general Alvaro Obregón and U.S president Calvin Coolidge. Obregón was eager to resolve issues with the U.S., including petroleum, in order to secure diplomatic recognition from the U.S. Negotiations over oil resulted in the Bucareli Treaty in 1923.

When revolutionary general Plutarco Elías Calles succeeded Obregón in 1924, he repudiated the Bucareli Treaty. Relations between the Calles government and the U.S. deteriorated further. In 1926, Calles implemented articles of the Mexican Constitution of 1917 that gave the state the power to suppress the role of the Roman Catholic Church in Mexico. A major civil uprising broke out, known as the Cristero War. The turmoil in Mexico prompted the U.S. government to replace its ambassador, appointing a Wall Street banker, Dwight W. Morrow to the post. Morrow played a key role in brokering an agreement between the Roman Catholic hierarchy and the Mexican government which ended the conflict in 1929. Morrow created a great deal of good will in Mexico by replacing the sign at the embassy to read "Embassy of the United States of America" rather than "American Embassy." He also commissioned Diego Rivera to paint murals at the palace of Hernán Cortés in Cuernavaca, Morelos, that depicted Mexican history.

During the presidency of revolutionary general Lázaro Cárdenas del Río, the controversy over petroleum again flared. Standard Oil had major investments in Mexico and a dispute between the oil workers and the company was to be resolved via the Mexican court system. The dispute, however, escalated, and on March 18, 1938, President Cárdenas used constitutional powers to expropriate foreign oil interests in Mexico and created the government-owned Petroleos Mexicanos or PEMEX. Although the United States has had a long history of interventions in Latin America, the expropriation did not result in that. U.S. President Franklin D. Roosevelt was implementing the Good Neighbor Policy, in which the U.S. eschewed the role of intervention and courted better relations with the region, which would be vital if another major conflict broke out in Europe. However, with the Great Depression, the United States implemented a program of expelling Mexicans from the U.S. in what was known as Mexican Repatriation.

Under President Cárdenas, Mexico in 1934-40 expropriated three million acres of agricultural land owned by 300 Americans. Its worth was a matter of debate: between $19 million and $102 million, but nothing was paid. Roosevelt settled the matter in 1938 quietly. He refused to aggressively intervene in Mexican agrarian disputes in order not to disrupt trade.  He was sympathetic to Mexican president Cárdenas's agrarian reform program, as was ambassador Josephus Daniels. On the other hand, Secretary of State Cordell Hull was antagonistic.

World War II 

When the U.S. did enter World War II, it negotiated an agreement with Mexican President Manuel Avila Camacho to be allies in the conflict against the Axis powers. The U.S. bought Mexican metals, especially copper and silver, but also importantly implemented a labor agreement with Mexico, known as the Bracero Program. Mexican agricultural workers were brought under contract to the U.S. to do mainly agricultural labor as well as harvesting timber in the northwest. The program continued in effect until 1964 when organized labor in the U.S. pushed for ending it. 
In 1940 Roosevelt appointed Nelson Rockefeller to head the new, well-funded Office of the Coordinator of Inter-American Affairs. Anti-fascist propaganda was a major project across Latin America, and was run by Rockefeller's office. It spent millions on radio broadcasts and motion pictures, hoping to reach a large audience. In addition to propaganda, large sums were allocated for economic support and development. Madison Avenue techniques generated a push back in Mexico, especially where well-informed locals resisted heavy-handed American influence. Mexico was a valuable ally in the war; many of the long-standing disputes about oil were resolved and relations were the warmest in history. The usually strident anti-American voices on the far Left were quiet because the U.S. and USSR were allies. After years of debate, Mexico sent a small air unit into the war in the Pacific. An arrangement was made whereby 250,000 Mexican citizens living in the United States served in the American forces; over 1000 were killed in combat.

Since 1945

The alliance between Mexico and the U.S. during World War II brought the two countries into a far more harmonious relationship with one another. Mexican President Manuel Avila Camacho met in person with both Franklin D. Roosevelt and Harry S. Truman, helping to cement ties with the U.S. Avila Camacho was not a leader in the Mexican Revolution himself, and held opinions that were pro-business and pro-religious that were more congenial to the U.S. while he maintained revolutionary rhetoric. During Avila Camacho's visit with Truman near the centenary of the Mexican–American War, Truman returned some of the Mexican banners captured by the United States in the conflict and praised the military cadets who died defending Mexico City during the invasion.

For bilateral relations between the U.S. and Mexico, the end of World War II meant decreased U.S. demand for Mexican labor via the guest-worker Bracero Program and for Mexican raw materials to fuel a major war. For Mexican laborers and Mexican exporters, there were fewer economic opportunities. However, while at the same time the government's coffers were full and aided post-war industrialization. In 1946, the dominant political party changed its name to the Institutional Revolutionary Party, and while maintaining revolutionary rhetoric, in fact embarked on industrialization that straddled the line between nationalist and pro-business policies. Mexico supported U.S. policies in the Cold War and did not challenge U.S. intervention in Guatemala that ousted leftist president Jacobo Arbenz.

Boundary issues and the border region

Under Mexican president Adolfo López Mateos, the U.S. and Mexico concluded a treaty on January 14, 1964, to resolve the Chamizal dispute over the boundary between the two countries, with the U.S. ceding the disputed territory. The Boundary Treaty of 1970 resolved further issues between the two countries.

Since then, jurisdictional issues regarding water rights in the Rio Grande Valley have continued to cause tension between farmers on both sides of the border, according to Mexican political scientist Armand Peschard-Sverdrup.

North American Free Trade Agreement (1994–present)

Mexico, United States and Canada signed the North American Free Trade Agreement (NAFTA) in 1994 with the goal of eliminating barriers to trade and investment.

After securing the NAFTA treaty that integrated the Mexican and American economies, President Bill Clinton faced yet another foreign crisis in early 1995. The Mexican peso  began to fall sharply and threatened the collapse of the Mexican economy. Clinton feared that a collapse would have a negative impact on the United States because of their close economic ties. He proposed a plan to address the financial crisis in Mexico, but many in Congress, fearing that constituents would not favor aid money to Mexico, rejected the plan. In response, Clinton used executive authority to create a $20 billion loan package for Mexico to restore international confidence in the Mexican economy. The loan went through and Mexico completed its loan payments to the United States in January 1997, three years ahead of schedule. However, issues such as drug smuggling and immigration continued to strain relations.

Since 1994, the United States and Mexico have tightened their economic ties. The US is Mexico's largest trading partner, accounting for close to half of all exports in 2008 and more than half of all imports in 2009. For the US, Mexico is the third largest trading partner after Canada and China . In 2017, two-way trade between both nations amounted to US$521.5 billion.  The trade in goods and services totaled $677 billion in 2019. Exports to Mexico were $289 billion; imports were $388 billion.

Illegal immigration from Mexico

In 2017, 47% of illegal immigrants in the United States originate from Mexico.  The United States has built a barrier on much of its border with Mexico.

In recent years, the majority crossing from Mexico into the United States have been from Central America.

Illegal trade of weapons

 

The US is the largest source of illicit traffic of weapons to Mexico. Many of the traceable weapons come from American weapons markets and festivals that do not have regulations for the buyers, and there is a geographic coincidence between the supposed American origin of the firearms and the places where these weapons are seized: mainly in the Northern Mexican states. 
Firearms that make their way to Mexico come from the American civilian market. However grenades are also smuggled from the US to Mexico. In an effort to control smuggling of firearms, the U.S. government is assisting Mexico with technology, equipment and training. Project Gunrunner was one such efforts between the U.S. and Mexico to collaborate in tracing Mexican guns which were manufactured in or imported legally to the U.S.

In 2015, Official reports of the U.S. government and the Bureau of Alcohol, Tobacco, Firearms and explosives (ATF) revealed that Mexican cartels improved their firearm power over that last years, and that 70% of their weapons come from the U.S.

ATF gunwalking scandal

The American ATF's Project Gunrunner has as its stated purpose the stoppage of the selling and exportation of guns from the United States into Mexico, with the goal of denying Mexican drug cartels the firearms considered "tools of the trade". However, in February 2011, it brought about a scandal when the project was accused of accomplishing the opposite by ATF permitting and facilitating "straw purchase" firearm sales to traffickers, and allowing the guns to "walk" and be transported to Mexico. Several of the guns sold under the Project Gunrunner were recovered from crime scenes in Arizona, and at crime scenes throughout Mexico.

Obama administration

Mexico was not high on the priorities of the Obama Administration, but slow progress was made on security issues.

As of 2013, Mexican students formed the 9th largest group of international students studying in the United States, representing 1.7% of all foreigners pursuing higher education in the U.S.

Trump administration 

The four-year term of President Donald Trump, who had provoked the ire of the Mexican government through threats against companies who invest in Mexico instead of the U.S, and his claims that he would construct a border wall and force Mexico to fund its construction, caused a decline in the relations of the two countries  in the late 2010s.

A 2017 survey conducted by the Pew Research Center showed 65% of Mexicans had a negative view of the US, with only 30% having a positive view. This constituted a significant and abrupt drop from 2015, prior to the 2016 United States presidential election, when 67% of Mexicans had a positive view of the United States. The same study also showed only 5% of Mexicans had confidence in the then US leader, President Donald Trump, with 93% having no confidence in him. Similarly, a poll by YouGov showed that less than one in four Americans have a positive image of Mexico.

Donald Trump won the 2016 U.S. presidential election partly with campaign promises of building a border wall with Mexico (the 'Trump Wall'). After Trump signed an executive order in January 2017, mandating construction of the wall, Mexican President Enrique Peña Nieto cancelled a scheduled visit to the U.S. Trump said that Mexico would pay for the construction of the wall, but did not explain how; Mexico has in turn rejected the idea of any Mexican funding.

Peña Nieto listed ten goals he would seek in NAFTA negotiations, notably safeguarding the free flow of remittances, which amount to about $25 billion per year. In August 2018, Mexico and the United States reached a bilateral agreement on a revamped NAFTA trade deal, including provisions to boost automobile production in the U.S.

On December 1, 2018, Mexico inaugurated President Andrés Manuel López Obrador (known as AMLO) as president.

In June 2019, a promise of a stricter Mexican asylum program and security tightening to slow the traffic of illegal immigrants into the US averted a possible tariff war between the two countries. The US had threatened a 5% import tariff on all Mexican goods.

In April 2020, Mexico closed a plant run by an American company for refusing to sell ventilators to Mexican hospitals during the COVID-19 pandemic. The firm had operated its plant under the argument it provided an “essential” service, when most non-essential plants were closed. Baja California Governor Jaime Bonilla Valdez ordered the factory closed, because it was providing no essential service to Mexicans. He said the company contacted Mexico's Foreign Relations Secretary and the American ambassador to prevent the closure order but that he did not cave in to pressure.

On July 7, 2020, President Lopez Obrador visited Washington, D.C. and met with Trump following the signing the United States–Mexico–Canada Agreement trade deal.

In late 2020, multiple human rights groups joined a whistleblower to accuse a private-owned U.S. immigration detention center in Georgia of forcible sterilization of women. The reports claimed a doctor conducted unauthorized medical procedures on women detained by the U.S. Immigration and Customs Enforcement (ICE). Some international organizations have characterized this forced sterilization as genocide. In September 2020, Mexico demanded more information from US authorities on procedures performed on migrants in these facilities, after allegations that six Mexican women were sterilized without their consent. Another women said she had undergone a gynecological operation, although there was nothing in her detention file to support she agreed to the procedure.

In October 2020, retired Secretary of National Defense Salvador Cienfuegos was arrested by U.S. officials at Los Angeles International Airport on alleged drug and money-laundering charges. General Cienfuegos's arrest infuriated President Obrador, who was particularly riled that Mexican officials had not been informed about the investigation into the general. Cienfuegos was cleared of all charges on 14 January 2021, and Obrador said the accusations against him was politically motivated. The U.S. Justice Department threatened to restart prosecution if Mexico didn't prosecute him.

Biden administration 

In March, the Biden administration confirmed it would not be sharing its COVID-19 vaccines with Mexico, according to White House press secretary Jen Psaki ahead of Biden's first bilateral meeting with Mexican President Andrés Manuel López Obrador. “The president has made clear that he is focused on ensuring vaccines are accessible to every American.” When Biden took office, Mexico had sought more cooperation with the US to increase Mexico's access to COVID-19 vaccine supplies.

In May, US regulators banned Mexican airlines from expanding new service or routes in the country. The FAA claimed there were "several areas" where the country did not meet aviation standards. President Obrador stated, "We have been complying with all the requirements. We feel that this decision should not be carried out." further stating the move appeared to help US airlines. "They are the ones who benefit and the national airlines could be harmed." As Mexico's airlines focused on domestic flights, the US ban was expected to have less impact.

In July 2021, President López Obrador blamed the US embargo against Cuba for contributing to the unrest in Cuba. The foreign ministry sent two navy ships with food and medical supplies to assist Cuba.

In September 2021, Mexico sued US-based gunmakers for trafficking guns into the country. The lawsuit stated guns from America are more likely to kill Mexican citizens than American citizens. US laws however protect gun makers from civil liability and prevents victims from suing manufacturers.

In January 2023, President Joe Biden traveled to Mexico to attend the North American Leaders' Summit in Mexico City.

Gallery

Diplomatic missions

of the United States in Mexico

 Mexico City (Embassy)
 Ciudad Juárez (Consulate General)
 Guadalajara (Consulate General)
 Hermosillo (Consulate General)
 Matamoros (Consulate General)
 Mérida (Consulate General)
 Monterrey (Consulate General)
 Nogales (Consulate General)
 Nuevo Laredo (Consulate General)
 Tijuana (Consulate General)
 Acapulco (Consular Agency)
 Cabo San Lucas (Consular Agency)
 Cancún (Consular Agency)
 Mazatlán (Consular Agency)
 Oaxaca (Consular Agency)
 Piedras Negras (Consular Agency)
 Playa del Carmen (Consular Agency)
 Puerto Vallarta (Consular Agency)
 San Miguel de Allende (Consular Agency)

of Mexico in the United States

 Washington, D.C. (Embassy)
 Atlanta (Consulate-General)
 Austin (Consulate-General)
 Boston (Consulate-General)
 Chicago (Consulate-General)
 Dallas (Consulate-General)
 Denver (Consulate-General)
 El Paso (Consulate-General)
 Houston (Consulate-General)
 Laredo (Consulate-General)
 Los Angeles (Consulate-General)
 Miami (Consulate-General)
 New York City (Consulate-General)
 Nogales (Consulate-General)
 Phoenix (Consulate-General)
 Raleigh (Consulate-General)
 Sacramento (Consulate-General)
 San Antonio (Consulate-General)
 San Diego (Consulate-General)
 San Francisco (Consulate-General)
 San Jose (Consulate-General)
 San Juan, Puerto Rico (Consulate-General)
 Albuquerque (Consulate)
 Boise (Consulate)
 Brownsville (Consulate)
 Calexico (Consulate)
 Del Rio (Consulate)
 Detroit (Consulate)
 Douglas (Consulate)
 Eagle Pass (Consulate)
 Fresno (Consulate)
 Indianapolis (Consulate)
 Kansas City (Consulate)
 Las Vegas (Consulate)
 Little Rock (Consulate)
 McAllen (Consulate)
 Milwaukee (Consulate)
 New Brunswick (Consulate)
 New Orleans (Consulate)
 Omaha (Consulate)
 Orlando (Consulate)
 Oxnard (Consulate)
 Philadelphia (Consulate)
 Portland (Consulate)
 Presidio (Consulate)
 Saint Paul (Consulate)
 Salt Lake City (Consulate)
 San Bernardino (Consulate)
 Santa Ana (Consulate)
 Seattle (Consulate)
 Tucson (Consulate)
 Yuma (Consulate)

Common memberships

 Asia-Pacific Economic Cooperation
 Bank for International Settlements
 Food and Agriculture Organization
 G-20
 International Atomic Energy Agency
 International Chamber of Commerce
 International Court of Justice
 International Olympic Committee
 International Monetary Fund
 International Telecommunication Union
 Interpol
 North American Free Trade Agreement
 Organisation for Economic Co-operation and Development
 Organization of American States
 Security and Prosperity Partnership of North America
 UNESCO
 United Nations
 World Bank
 World Health Organization
 World Trade Organization

See also

 American immigration to Mexico
 Emigration from Mexico
 Mexican Americans

References

Further reading

 Adams, John A. Bordering the Future: The Impact of Mexico on the United States (2006), 184pp
 Becerra Gelóver, Alejandro. "A Single Reality? The Reasons Behind Different Perceptions of Mexico-US Relations." Voices of Mexico (2001). online
 Berger, Dina. The development of Mexico's tourism industry: Pyramids by day, martinis by night (Palgrave Macmillan, 2006)
 
 Bustamante, Ana Marleny. "The Impact of Post-9/11 US Policy on the California–Baja California Border Region." Journal of Borderlands Studies (2013) 28#3 pp: 307–319.
 Castañeda, Jorge G. "NAFTA's Mixed Record: The View from Mexico." Foreign Affairs 93 (2014): 134. online
 Castro-Rea, Julián, ed. Our North America: Social and Political Issues Beyond NAFTA (Ashgate, 2013) excerpt
 Cline, Howard F. The United States and Mexico (Harvard UP, 2nd ed. 1961)
 
 .
 Fox, Claire F. The Fence and the River: Culture and Politics at the US–Mexico Border (U of Minnesota Press, 1999)
 Frank, Lucas N. “Playing with Fire: Woodrow Wilson, Self-Determination, Democracy, and Revolution in Mexico.” Historian 76#1 (2014), pp. 71–96, online.
 .
 Gladstone, Fiona, et al. "NAFTA and environment after 25 years: A retrospective analysis of the US-Mexico border." Environmental Science & Policy 119 (2021): 18-33. online
 Haley, P. Edward. Revolution and Intervention: The Diplomacy of Taft and Wilson with Mexico, 1910–1917 (MIT Press, 1970) online
 Henderson, Peter V. N.  “Woodrow Wilson, Victoriano Huerta, and the Recognition Issue in Mexico.” The Americas 41#2 (1984), pp. 151–76, online.
 Hiemstra, Nancy. "Pushing the US-Mexico border south: United States' immigration policing throughout the Americas." International Journal of Migration and Border Studies 5.1-2 (2019): 44-63. online
 Hill, Larry D. "Woodrow Wilson's Executive Agents in Mexico: From the Beginning of His Administration to the Recognition of Venustiano Carranza" (PhD dissertation; 2 vol Louisiana State U, 1971) online
 Henderson, Timothy J. A Glorious Defeat: Mexico and Its War with the United States (2007). focus on causation from Mexican perspective online
 Hinojosa, Victor J. Domestic Politics and International Narcotics Control: U.S. Relations with Mexico and Colombia, 1989–2000 (2007)
 Jauberth, H. Rodrigo, et al. The Difficult Triangle: Mexico, Central America, and the United States (Routledge, 2019).
 Kahle, Louis G. "Robert Lansing and the Recognition of Venustiano Carranza." Hispanic American Historical Review 38.3 (1958): 353-372. online
 Kane, Stephen N. "American businessmen and foreign policy: The recognition of Mexico, 1920-1923." Political Science Quarterly 90.2 (1975): 293-313 online. 
 .
 Lim, Julian. Porous Borders: Multiracial Migrations and the Law in the US-Mexico Borderlands (UNC Press Books, 2017)
 Merrill, Tim and Ramón Miró. Mexico: a country study (Library of Congress. Federal Research Division, 1996) US government document; not copyright online free
 Meyer, Lorenzo. Mexico and the United States in the oil controversy, 1917–1942 (University of Texas Press, 2014)
 Montoya, Benjamin C. Risking Immeasurable Harm: Immigration Restriction and US-Mexican Diplomatic Relations, 1924–1932 (U of Nebraska Press, 2020).

 Moreno, Julio. Yankee don't go home!: Mexican nationalism, American business culture, and the shaping of modern Mexico, 1920–1950 (University of North Carolina Press, 2003)
 .
 Pastor, Robert A. Limits to Friendship: The United States and Mexico (Vintage, 2011)
 Plana, Manuel. "The Mexican Revolution and the U.S. Border: Research Perspectives," Journal of the Southwest (2007), 49#4 pp 603–613, historiography
 Pletcher, David M. The Diplomacy of Annexation: Texas, Oregon, and the Mexican War (U of Missouri Press, 1973) online
 Pletcher, David M. Rails, mines, and progress : seven American promoters in Mexico, 1867-1911 (1958) online
 Raat, W. Dirk and Michael M. Brescia. Mexico and the United States: Ambivalent Vistas (2010), a history
 
 Ruiz, Jason. Americans in the Treasure House: Travel to Porfirian Mexico and the Cultural Politics of Empire (University of Texas Press, 2014). excerpt
 Santa Cruz, Arturo. Mexico–United States Relations: The Semantics of Sovereignty (Routledge, 2012)
 Schmitt, Karl M. Mexico and the United States, 1821-1973 (1974)
 Selee, Andrew. Vanishing Frontiers: The Forces Driving Mexico and the United States (2018)  excerpt 
Shoemaker, Raymond L. "Henry Lane Wilson and Republican Policy toward Mexico, 1913-1920." Indiana Magazine of History (1980): 103-122. online
 Simon, Suzanne. Sustaining the Borderlands in the Age of NAFTA: Development, Politics, and Participation on the US-Mexico Border ( Vanderbilt University Press, 2014).
 Slack, Jeremy, and Daniel E. Martínez. "Postremoval Geographies: Immigration Enforcement and Organized Crime on the US–Mexico Border." Annals of the American Association of Geographers 111.4 (2021): 1062-1078. online
 Weintraub, Sidney. Unequal Partners: The United States and Mexico (University of Pittsburgh Press; 2010) 172 pages; Focuses on trade, investment and finance, narcotics, energy, migration, and the border. online

Illegal activities
 Díaz, George T. Border Contraband: A History of Smuggling across the Rio Grande (University of Texas Press, 2015) xiv, 241 pp. excerpt
 Dowling, Julie A., and Jonathan Xavier Inda, eds. Governing Immigration Through Crime: A Reader. (Stanford University Press, 2013).
 

 Ferreyra, Gabriel. Drug Trafficking in Mexico and the United States (2020). excerpt
 Gratton, Brian, and Emily Merchant. “Immigration, Repatriation, and Deportation: The Mexican-Origin Population in the United States, 1920–1950.” International Migration Revie 47$3 2013, pp. 944–75. online.
 Gravelle, Timothy B. "Politics, time, space, and attitudes toward US–Mexico border security." Political Geography 65 (2018): 107-116. online
 

 Hopkins, Daniel J. “Politicized Places: Explaining Where and When Immigrants Provoke Local Opposition.” American Political Science Review 104#1 (2010), pp. 40–60. online

 Inda, Jonathan Xavier. Targeting Immigrants: Government, Technology, and Ethics. Malden, MA: Wiley-Blackwell, 2006.
 Kalhan, Anil, Rethinking Immigration Detention, 110 Columbia Law Review Sidebar 42, 2010
 Kalhan, Anil, Immigration Policing and Federalism Through the Lens of Technology, Surveillance, and Privacy, 74 Ohio State Law Journal (2013) 1105+
 Kamphoefner, Walter D. "What’s New About the New Immigration? A Historian’s Perspective over Two Centuries." Studia Migracyjne-Przegląd Polonijny 45.3 (173) (2019). online

 Ngai, Mae M. Impossible Subjects: Illegal Aliens and the Making of Modern America (2004)
 Ngai, Mae M. “The Strange Career of the Illegal Alien: Immigration Restriction and Deportation Policy in the United States, 1921-1965.” Law and History Review 21#1 2003, pp. 69–107. online
 Payan, Tony. The Three U.S.-Mexico Border Wars: Drugs, Immigration, and Homeland Security (2nd ed. 2016). excerpt 
  Weintraub, Sidney. The illegal alien from Mexico : policy choices for an intractable issue (1980) online

In Spanish
 Bosch García, Carlos. Documentos de la relación de México con los Estados Unidos.  Volumes 1–2. National Autonomous University of Mexico, 1983. , .
 Terrazas y Basante, Marcela, and Gerardo Gurza Lavalle. Las relaciones México–Estados Unidos, 1756–2010: Tomo I: Imperios, repúblicas, y pueblos en pugna por el territorio, 1756–1867 (The Mexican-American Relationship, 1756–2010: Part 1; Empires, Republics, and People Fighting for the Territory, 1756–1867). Mexico City: Universidad Nacional Autónoma de México, 2012.
 Terrazas y Basante, Marcela, and Gerardo Gurza Lavalle. Las relaciones México–Estados Unidos, 1756–2010: Tomo II: ¿Destino no manifesto?, 1867–2010. (The Mexican–American Relationship, 1756–2010: Part 2: A Non-Manifest Destiny?, 1867–2010). Mexico City: Universidad Nacional Autónoma de México, 2012.
 Woodbury, Ronald G. “Wilson y La Intervención de Veracruz: Análisis Historiográfico.” Historia Mexicana 17#2 (1967), pp. 263–92, online in Spanish.

 
United States
Bilateral relations of the United States